KDAK (1600 AM) is a radio station licensed to serve Carrington, North Dakota. The station is owned by Ingstad Family Media. KDAK airs a classic hits format and covers local and national sports games, including the New Rockford-Sheyenne Rockets, New Rockford Blacksox, and Carrington Cardinals.

History
In February 2018, KDAK changed their format from country to classic hits, branded as "The Cardinal".

Previous logo

FM translator

References

External links

FCC History Cards for KDAK

Carrington, North Dakota
Classic hits radio stations in the United States
DAK
Radio stations established in 1983